The Honda AC15 or Dream 50 is a retro style street legal  single cylinder motorcycle manufactured by Honda in 1997 (CB50V) and 1998 (CB50W).

Design
Honda built the AC15 to commemorate the successful 1962 Honda RC110 single cylinder racer. Showing the 1960s style were short racing handlebars and an elongated and low-profile fuel tank.

The frame was a diamond design with a reinforced single front down tube bolting to the engine's crankcase. The top of the frame was a reinforced double-tube over and under configuration meeting a multi-tube box under the rider.

Front and rear disc brakes were standard and unusual for a small displacement motorcycle.

The engine was a rare design for 50 cubic centimeters, having a single cylinder with double overhead camshafts.

A commercial racer was available in 1962 called the CR110 Cub Racing which produced  from a single cylinder and had drum brakes. A race only version, designated the AR02 or Dream 50R, was imported into the US in 2004.

References

Ac15
Motorcycles introduced in 1997